Adam Michael Bagni (born November 16, 1984 in Taunton, MA) is a former American journalist and sportscaster.

Biography

College
Bagni is a graduate of La Salle University in Philadelphia.  While at La Salle, he served as general manager of WEXP and was the play-by-play voice for campus radio sports broadcasts. He was also a writer for the Collegian.

Career
Bagni is a former reporter at WCVB in Boston and is currently the Director of Communications and Community Relations at Wentworth-Douglass Hospital. Previously, he was an anchor/reporter at KPNX in Phoenix, where he also contributed to the station's investigative unit.  He was previously a reporter at WHDH in Boston and the Massachusetts bureau reporter, and a sports anchor/reporter, for WJAR.  During his time there, he also worked on radio as a flash anchor on WEEI.

Previously, he was the Sports Director at WNCF. He left the station in March 2011.

Bagni has received multiple Emmy Award nominations by the National Academy of Television Arts and Sciences, as well as honors from the National Sportscasters and Sportswriters Association, Alabama Broadcasters Association  
and Pennsylvania Association of Broadcasters.

References

American radio sports announcers
American television sports announcers
American television talk show hosts
Sports in Philadelphia
Sports in Boston
Television personalities from Philadelphia
People from Taunton, Massachusetts
La Salle University alumni
1984 births
Living people
Sportswriters from Pennsylvania
Sportswriters from Massachusetts